Jumia Travel is an online travel agency providing online hotel reservations across the African continent.

History 
Jumia Travel was founded in 2013 by the E-commerce platform Africa Internet Group (now Jumia Group) and is backed by MTN, Rocket Internet, Millicom, Orange, Axa and other financial partners. Operations were started in 2013 in Nigeria and Kenya by company's co-founder Marek Zmysłowski  and Estelle Verdier. It was then expanded to other African countries in 2014, starting with Senegal, Cameroon, Ghana, Tanzania, Uganda and then Algeria.

In 2015, Paul Midy joined Jumia Travel as Chief Executive Officer. In June 2016, the company was rebranded from Jovago.com to Jumia Travel, to join other companies under the parent company, Jumia Group.

In 2016, Jumia Travel signed a global partnership with AccorHotels to widen the range of luxury hotels offered on the website, and to work with the French hotel chain to develop their business interests Africa. In 2016 Jumia Group became the continent's first unicorn, being valued at over 1 billion USD.

Starting as an online hotel booking portal, in February 2017 Jumia Travel unveiled its flight services in a bid to deepen its travel offerings to travelers in Africa and beyond and partnered with several local and international airlines on the continent including Arik Air, RwandAir Express, Qatar Airways, Emirates, Ethiopian Airlines, among others.

In September 2017, Jumia Travel appointed Joe Falter, founder of Jumia Food and EVP of On-Demand Services at Jumia Group as CEO in place of Paul Midy who exited the position for a different role at Jumia Group.

In January 2018, there was a scandal where the Jumia Travel co founder Marek Zmysłowski was accused by Nigerian investors of defrauding them of about $300 000. 

The incident led to Marek being wanted by the Interpol and Nigerian police. Marek claimed that the Nigerian investors were trying to use the Interpol to extort him. Iyinoluwa Aboyeji, co-founder of Andela, told Ventureburn in a call that he had tried to mediate between angry investors and Marek, but that Marek "has a track record of telling lies."

Maneesh Garg, CEO of Afriglobal Group also said that Marek was "a sweet-talker" and had sold him a lie 

Marek went on to write a book about it titled, Chasing Black Unicorns. 

He also did a TED talk about the incident. 

In December 2019, Jumia Travel was acquired by South African competitor Travelstart.

Operations
The Jumia Travel website operates out of 10 local offices across Africa and 3 regional headquarters in its main African markets (Lagos, Nairobi and Dakar). The website is available in English and French as well as in other African languages (Yoruba, Ibo, Hausa and Swahili), making Jumia Travel the first global travel agency to use local African languages on its website. The customer service provides support 24/7 out of its African offices.

In East Africa Jumia Travel offers both resident and non-resident rates to encourage people living in the region to travel to neighboring countries. Customers can pay using local payment options including mobile payment applications such as M-Pesa or MTN's mobile money.

Jumia Travel uses mobile apps, Extranet, Progressive Web App and can provide customer support on tools like Whatsapp, Viber for Mobile, following the growing internet and smartphone penetration in Africa.

Awards 
In 2015, the company won "Best Hotel Booking Portal", "Leading Online Hotel Booking Company" and the "Best Use of Technology" in Nigeria (Lagos 2015).

Jumia Travel organizes also Travel Awards in Nigeria and other countries, recognizing major players in the travel industry from Hotels to Travel Bloggers and Journalists.

TV interviews 
 CNBC AFRICA's 2014-09-23: l Uwana Ekpat caught up with Marek Zmyslowski CEO Jovago to explore Nigeria's e-commerce industry
 CCTV AFRICA 2014-09-29: l Jovago wants to shed light on less-known destinations in Africa. » Interview Estelle Verdier, Managing Director Jovago East Africa
 RTS1 Radiodiffusion Télévision Sénégalaise- 2015-03-15:   Jovago wants to promote tourism in Senegal

See also
Jumia

References

Nigerian travel websites
Hospitality companies established in 2013
Internet properties established in 2013
Companies based in Lagos
2013 establishments in Nigeria
2019 mergers and acquisitions